Alirezavandi (also Romanized as ‘Alīreẕāvandī; also known as Şeyd Ayāz-e ‘Alīreẕā Vandī) is a village in Gowavar Rural District, Govar District, Gilan-e Gharb County, Kermanshah Province, Iran. At the 2006 census, its population was 36, in 6 families.

References 

Populated places in Gilan-e Gharb County